Events from the year 1690 in Ireland.

Incumbent
Monarch: William III and Mary II

Events
June 14 – King William III of England (William of Orange) lands at Carrickfergus in Ulster and marches south to take Dublin.
June 29 – Williamites reach the River Boyne.
July 1 (O.S.) – Battle of the Boyne: William III defeats the deposed James II of England, who returns to exile in France from Kinsale.
July 17 – William III issues the Declaration of Finglas offering a pardon to ordinary Jacobites but not their leaders.
August 7 – William III and his army reach Limerick.
August to September – Siege of Limerick, by the Williamites is unsuccessful.
September – Siege of Cork.
October 7 – an earthquake with its epicentre at Caernarfon is felt in Dublin.
Siege of Athlone by the Williamites is unsuccessful.

Births
September 26 – Charles Macklin, actor and dramatist (d.1797)
Charles Clinton, French and Indian War Colonel (d.1773)
William Cosby, British royal governor of New York (d.1736)

Deaths
July 1 (O.S.) – Battle of the Boyne
Frederick Schomberg, 1st Duke of Schomberg, soldier (b. 1615 or 1616)
Rev. Sir George Walker, soldier, Governor of Londonderry (b. c. 1618)

References

 
1690s in Ireland
Ireland
Years of the 17th century in Ireland